SoulSplitter is the ninth studio album by Praga Khan. It was released in 2013.

Track listing
 "You Lift Me Higher" – 4:51	
 "We Follow the Sun" – 6:14	
 "Sometimes" – 6:25	
 "SoulSplitter" – 5:53	
 "The Girl with Crystal Hair" – 3:45	
 "Jennifer" – 6:39	
 "The Sinner" – 4:35	
 "Up Against the World" – 4:40	
 "Lemon Drops and Pixie Dreams" – 4:16	
 "I Am Your Drug (feat. Inja Van Gastel)" – 5:32	
 "Liquid Lightning" – 4:38
 "Lady Strange" – 3:53

2013 albums
Praga Khan albums